Pteroteinon capronnieri, or Capronnier's red-eye, is a butterfly in the family Hesperiidae. It is found in Ivory Coast, Ghana, Nigeria, Cameroon, the Republic of the Congo, the Central African Republic, the Democratic Republic of the Congo, western Uganda and north-western Tanzania. The habitat consists of deep forests.

References

Butterflies described in 1879
Erionotini
Butterflies of Africa